The 2020 Boston Uprising season was the third season of Boston Uprising's existence in the Overwatch League and their first under head coach Vytis "Mineral" Lasaitis. Boston planned to host two homestand weekends in the 2020 season at Citizens Bank Opera House in Boston, but all homestand matches were canceled due to the COVID-19 pandemic.

The Uprising qualified for one midseason tournament, the Summer Showdown, in the 2020 season but were eliminated by the Washington Justice in the knockouts round. The Uprising ended the season with 2 wins and 19 losses in the regular season and were eliminated from postseason contention after losing to the Atlanta Reign in the North America Play-in tournament.

Preceding offseason

Organizational changes 
In September 2019, Boston announced that former Florida Mayhem head coach Vytis "Mineral" Lasaitis would be the fill the team's head coach vacancy, which had been empty for over a year. A month later, the Uprising released assistant coaches Jordan "Gunba" Graham and Jackson "Shake" Kaplan; the team signed Ilias "iLka" Kaskanetas, who had most recently been the head coach of European Overwatch Contenders team Angry Titans, as an assistant coach. On December 9, the team signed former HSL Esports support player Valentin "Ascoft" Wulfman as an assistant coach.

Roster changes 

The Uprising enter the new season with two free agents, four players which they have the option to retain for another year, and four players under contract. The OWL's deadline to exercise a team option is November 11, after which any players not retained will become a free agent. Free agency officially began on October 7.

Acquisitions 
Boston made their first offseason acquisitions on October 28, when they signed support Seo "Myunbong" Sang-min and DPS Min "Jerry" Tae-hui from Korean Contenders teams from O2 Blast and Meta Athena, respectively. On November 7, Boston promoted support Gabriel "Swimmer" Levy and off-tank Walid "Mouffin" Bassal from their academy team, Uprising Academy. While Swimmer was promoted to play strictly for Boston, Mouffin was put on a two-way contract. On November 21, Uprising signed former Seoul Dynasty DPS Sang-Beom "Munchkin" Byun, and a day later, they signed tank Thomas "brussen" Brussen.

Departures 
The Uprising announced on October 21 that they would not elect to retain all four of their players with a team option – support Yang "Persia" Zion, support Renan "alemao" Moretto, off-tank Richard "rCk" Kanerva, and DPS Lee "Stellar" Do-hyung. Additionally, they also announced the same day that they would not re-sign either of their free agents – Kwon "AimGod" Min-seok and Kristian "Kellex" Keller. The following day, the team transferred DPS Jeffrey "blasé" Tsang to the Houston Outlaws.

Roster

Transactions 
Transactions of/for players on the roster during the 2020 regular season:
On March 2, the Uprising released DPS Byun "Munchkin" Sang-beom.
On March 3, the Uprising signed support Kobe "Halo" Hamand.
On April 4, the Uprising released tank Walid "Mouffin" Bassal.
On April 14, the Uprising released support Gabriel "Swimmer" Levy.
On May 11, the Uprising signed tank Leyton "Punk" Gilchrist.
On May 12, tank Thomas "brussen" Brussen retired.
On May 21, the Uprising signed tank Michael "mikey" Konicki.

Standings

Game log

Regular season

Midseason tournaments 

| style="text-align:center;" | Bonus wins awarded: 0

Postseason

References 

Boston Uprising
Boston Uprising
Boston Uprising seasons